Sara Trier Hald (born 4 June 1996) is a Danish handball player who plays for Odense Håndbold.

International honours
EHF Cup Winners' Cup:
Winner: 2016  
EHF Cup:
Winner: 2015

Individual awards  
 All-Star Line Player of the EHF Junior European Championship: 2015

References

1996 births
Living people
People from Holstebro
Danish female handball players
Sportspeople from the Central Denmark Region